The Battersea Cauldron is a large bronze cooking vessel, dated to 800BC to 700BC.  It is one of around 60 examples of similar Iron Age cauldrons found in Great Britain and Ireland.

It was made from seven curved plates of bronze riveted together, forming a cooking vessel with a large round body and narrower neck. The opening flares out, strengthened with corrugations around the rim, which has a separate tubular binding. Two ring handles are attached to riveted straps. As a large vessel for preparing food or drink, it may have been used for communal feasts, and has the patches and repairs from use over an extended period, perhaps several generations. It may have been deliberately placed in the river as a religious sacrifice.

The cauldron was found in 1861 from dredging in the River Thames near the new Chelsea Bridge, which connects Chelsea on the north bank to Battersea on the south bank.  It was bought by the British Museum from William Godwin shortly after it was discovered.

See also
 The Battersea Shield, found nearby a few years earlier
 The rarer Chiseldon cauldrons are later.

References
 Battersea Cauldron, British Museum
 Cauldrons and feasting in the Iron  Age, British Museum
 Cauldrons and flesh-hooks: between the living and the dead in ancient Britain and Ireland, British Museum
 The Battersea cauldron, Google Arts & Culture

Archaeological artefacts from the River Thames
Iron Age Britain
Bronzeware
History of London
Votive offering
1861 archaeological discoveries